John Hawarde or Hayward  (c. 1571–1631), of Tandridge Hall, Surrey was an English politician.

He was a Member (MP) of the Parliament of England for Bletchingley in 1621 and 1624. He was a member of the Inner Temple and educated at Christ's College, Cambridge.

References

1570s births
1631 deaths
English MPs 1621–1622
English MPs 1624–1625
People from Surrey
Alumni of Christ's College, Cambridge